Carmel Alison Lam Foundation Secondary School is a secondary school in Hong Kong established in 1982.

School Management Committee
The School Management Committee is the top management of the school.

Staff and students
The school had about 1200 students in 30 classes and had 70 staff in 2007.

Projects
A Reading Award Scheme is launched to establish a reading culture among students, with the aim of enhancing students' language proficiency.
Starting from the academic year 2004–05, online learning through the eClass platform was introduced to the school. An individual account is allocated to every teacher and student, so that students can continue their online learning after school and during holidays. Through the platform, teachers and students can carry out online discussions as well as obtain the latest information.

In 1992, the school introduced "ASL Liberal Studies" to the curriculum.

In the 2004 Advanced Level Examinations, students achieved a 100% passing rate in Liberal Studies. 
Beginning in 2005, Liberal Studies were introduced to the Form One curriculum, so that students are familiarized with the subject that will be implemented under a new academic structure. Liberal Studies equips students to understand today's social, national and global issues.

Academic and extracurricular performance
In the past three years, thirteen subjects obtained 90% or above passing rate in the HKCE and HKAL examinations (100% passed in seven of
the subjects), 80% in ten other subjects, and the distinction and credit rate of 16 subjects has been above the average rate in Hong Kong. In respect of extra-curricular performances, students have won awards in the following competitions: 
Hong Kong Schools Speech Festival and Music Festival
Hong Kong Multiple Intelligence Competition
Hong Kong New Generation IQ Contest 
Statistical Project Competition for Secondary School Students, 
Hong Kong Schools Drama Festival,
Chinese chess and Go competition, 
International and district sand sculpturing competitions, 
New Territories and Kwai Tsing district competitions:
handball
swimming
athletics 
cross country running 
basketball 
volleyball 
badminton 
Association football
table-tennis  
All Hong Kong Schools and Asian bowling and squash competition, 
Hong Kong Reading Carnival Booth Design Competition

External links

School campus 25th anniversary

Protestant secondary schools in Hong Kong
Nondenominational Christian schools in Hong Kong
Kwai Chung
Kwai Tsing District
1982 establishments in Hong Kong